"Wanted" is a song by American band OneRepublic, released as the second single from their fifth studio album Human through Interscope Records on September 6, 2019. It was co-written by frontman Ryan Tedder with bassist Brent Kutzle, and Casey Smith, Tyler Spry and Zach Skelton. On December 20, 2019, a new version titled "Wanted (String Mix)", was released, which features more string instruments.

Music video
The music video was shown to Universal Music Group executives in Berlin in September 2019; it was noted for Tedder's dance performance. On December 23, 2019, a performance video was released for the "String Mix", showing Ryan Tedder singing while the Colorado Symphony played.

Track listing
Digital download
 "Wanted" – 2:16

Digital download – TT Spry Remix
"Wanted" (TT Spry Remix) – 2:54

Digital download – String Mix
"Wanted" (String Mix) – 2:15

Charts

Certifications

Release history

References

2019 singles
OneRepublic songs
Songs written by Ryan Tedder
Songs written by Zach Skelton
Songs written by Brent Kutzle